Antonina Alekseyevna Melnikova (born 19 February 1958) is a Belarusian sprint canoer who competed for the Soviet Union. She won a bronze medal in the K-1 500 m  event at the 1980 Olympics.

References

1958 births
People from Rahachow
Canoeists at the 1980 Summer Olympics
Living people
Olympic canoeists of the Soviet Union
Olympic bronze medalists for the Soviet Union
Soviet female canoeists
Olympic medalists in canoeing
Russian female canoeists

Medalists at the 1980 Summer Olympics